Naŋa dama, also known as Naŋa tegu, is a Dogon language spoken in Mali that is only known from one report from 1953. Roger Blench reports that its nearest relative is the recently described Walo–Kumbe Dogon, "with which it shares both lexicon and the feature that many nouns have a final -m." Hochstetler thinks they may be the same language. It may be close to Yanda Dogon (Blench) or Jamsai tegu (Hochstetler).

References

Further reading
 Bertho, J. 1953. "La place des dialectes Dogon (dogo) de la falaise de Bandiagara parmi les autres groupes linguistiques de la zone soudanaise". In Bulletin de l’Institut Français de l’ Afrique Noire. Vol. XV. Dakar, pp. 405–441
 .
 

Dogon languages
Languages of Mali